Pike Township, Indiana may refer to one of the following places:

 Pike Township, Jay County, Indiana
 Pike Township, Marion County, Indiana
 Pike Township, Ohio County, Indiana
 Pike Township, Warren County, Indiana

See also 

Pike Township (disambiguation)

Indiana township disambiguation pages